This is a partial list of viral videos, including those that are music videos, that gained rapid attention on the Internet. Like Internet memes, viewership of such videos tend to grow rapidly and become more widespread because of instant communication facilitates and word of mouth.

This list documents videos known to have become viral; additional videos that have become Internet phenomena for other categories can be found at list of Internet phenomena.

General videos

2 Girls 1 Cup – A video of two girls engaging in coprophilia. This video has also originated a series of amateur videos showing the reactions of people seeing the original video.
2 Hours Doing Nothing – Video of Indonesian YouTuber Muhammad Didit staring in his camera and doing nothing for two hours, published on 10 July 2020. It achieved 1.7 million views on the day of release, and 3 million in one month. After receiving positive comments by the media and politician Sandiaga Uno, it was later adapted to a mobile game.

300-page iPhone bill – A 300-page iPhone bill from AT&T Mobility mailed in a box was the subject of a viral video made by YouTube personality Justine Ezarik, best known as iJustine, which became an Internet meme in August 2007. Ezarik's video focused on the unnecessary waste of paper, as the detailed bill itemized all data transfers made during the billing period, including every email and text message. Stories of unexpected billing issues began to circulate in blogs and the technical press after the Apple iPhone's heavily advertised and anticipated release, but this video clip brought the voluminous bills to the attention of the mass media. Ten days later, after the video had been viewed more than 3 million times on the Internet and had received international news coverage, AT&T sent iPhone users a text message outlining changes in its billing practices. The information technology magazine Computerworld included this incident in its list of "Technology's 10 Most Mortifying Moments".

11B-X-1371 – An unsettling video filmed in an abandoned Polish sanatorium, in which someone wearing a plague doctor costume gesticulates toward coded messages making threats against the U.S. President. Further less specific threats and disturbing images were found hidden in the spectrogram of the video's soundtrack.

2007 Miss Teen USA Pageant – A video of Caitlin Upton's response to a question at the Miss Teen USA 2007 received over 3.5 million views on YouTube in three days.

Ain't Nobody Got Time for That – A news interview with Kimberly "Sweet Brown" Wilkins, of Oklahoma City, in April 2012. Wilkins was asked about her escape from her burning apartment complex; she concluded the conversation by remarking "I got bronchitis! Ain't nobody got time for that!" The phrase has been reprinted on various forms of merchandise, while Wilkins appeared on television programs. Jimmy Kimmel later made a parody starring Queen Latifah as Wilkins inspiring people across history with phrases from the video. Wilkins herself appears in a cameo.

Angry German Kid – A video of a German teenager trying to play Unreal Tournament on his PC, but he faces problems with it which causes him to get enraged and shout, as well as smashing his keyboard in some scenes.

Arrest of Vladimir Putin – The mock video shows Russian President (then Prime Minister) Vladimir Putin facing a courtroom trial. The footage was taken from the real-life trial of Mikhail Khodorkovsky and then digitally altered to make a faux news report. As of April 2018, the viral video has over 12 million views.

asdfmovie – A series of short animated videos created by British YouTuber TomSka with a skit-type format. Each video is around 2 minutes long. As of July 2021, there are 13 videos in the collection. 

Asians in the Library – A racist rant by Alexandra Wallace, an undergraduate student at the University of California, Los Angeles, in March 2011.

Bill O'Reilly Freaks Out – An outtake from Bill O'Reilly's tenure on Inside Edition, which depicted O'Reilly cursing at his co-workers while having issues with the closing lines on his teleprompter. After the video went viral in May 2008, O'Reilly acknowledged the video's existence, claiming that he was amusing his co-workers and said "I have plenty of much newer stuff...If you want to buy the tapes that I have, I'm happy to sell them to you." The rant was later parodied by Stephen Colbert on The Colbert Report as well as Family Guy and by Trevor Noah on The Daily Show, and was named one of Time's "Top 10 Celebrity Meltdowns".

Bitchy Resting Face – a parody comedy public service announcement video by the Funny Or Die comedy team that has since gone on to become a popular internet meme, and to become more commonly known as resting bitch face (RBF).

Boom goes the dynamite – Brian Collins, a nervous sports anchor, fumbles highlights, concluding with this infamous catchphrase. It's become commonly used in many things, including an episode of Family Guy and being quoted by Will Smith when he flubbed a line on stage during the 81st Academy Awards telecast. As of March 2009, Collins was a reporter for KXXV in Waco, Texas.

Bitconnect – A keynote speech by Carlos Matos. The video features Matos screaming "Bitconnect" and "I Love Bitconect". Due to the nature of the speech and Matos consistently promoting a fraud, the speech has been remixed and edited by various people.

Charlie Bit My Finger – It features two young brothers; the younger bites the finger of the older brother.

Chewbacca Mask Lady – A video of an enthusiastic woman, named Candace Payne, wearing a Chewbacca mask. Posted on 19 May 2016, it has become the most-viewed Facebook Live video of all time with over 140 million views.

The Crazy Nastyass Honey Badger – A YouTube video posted by the user Randall in 2011 featuring a comedic narration dubbed over pre-existing National Geographic footage.

Damn Daniel – A series of Snapchat videos depicting Joshua Holz complementing his friend Daniel Lara's Vans. In 2016, Time magazine listed Lara as one of "The 30 Most Influential People on the Internet".

David After Dentist – A video of 7-year old David DeVore Jr's reaction to anesthesia.

Dancing Matt – Video game designer Matt Harding filmed himself in 2003, dancing in front of various world landmarks. Eventually, a chewing gum company sent him off to dance on seven continents, and by October 2006 the video had over 5 million views. Harding compiled two similar videos in 2008 and 2012.

Diet Coke and Mentos – Geysers of carbonated drink mixed with Mentos.

Double Rainbow – a video posted to YouTube by Paul Vasquez of him filming a double rainbow Yosemite National Park. Vasquez's amazed and overwhelmed response includes philosophical questions about the rainbows, such as "what do they mean?". Subsequently, the video went viral, and an auto-tuned remix named the "Double Rainbow Song" using the video's audio track was later released by the Gregory Brothers, receiving more than 30 million views and becoming another meme.

Dramatic Chipmunk – A video featuring a prairie dog (almost always inaccurately called a chipmunk) turning its head suddenly toward the camera, with a zoom-in on its face while suspenseful music plays.

Drinking Out of Cups – A video of Dan Deacon's 2003 spoken-word song of the same name. The video features an anthropomorphized lizard describing various scenes in an exaggerated Long Island accent. 

Edgar's fall – A video in which a Mexican boy tries to cross a stream using a branch, which gets lifted by his cousin causing him to fall into the stream.

eHarmony Video Bio – Video of a woman calling herself "Debbie" in an online dating video who ends up getting very emotional over her affection for cats. The staged video was uploaded to the YouTube channel of Cara Hartmann, a resident of Lower Merion Township, Pennsylvania. In 2013, she was featured in a Volkswagen commercial for the Super Bowl XLVII.

Epic Beard Man – Video of a bus fight in Oakland, California in which 67-year-old Thomas Bruso physically defends himself against an African-American man after being accused of racial prejudice then punched by him.

Evolution of Dance – A video of a six-minute live performance of motivational speaker Judson Laipply's routine consisting of several recognizable dance movies to respective songs. The video was one of the earliest examples of a viral video posted on YouTube, having received 23 million hits within 2 weeks of posting in mid-2006, and was marked as an example of low budget, user-generated content achieving broadcast television-sized audiences.

Gallon smashing – The act of smashing a gallon of liquid in a manner that appears to be accidental. The prank often involves throwing a gallon of milk onto a grocery store aisle, then falling and sometimes having difficulty returning to a standing position.

Heroine of HackneyA video showing a local woman from Hackney berating looters during the 2011 England riots.

Impossible Is Nothing – An exaggerated and falsehood-filled video résumé by Yale student Aleksey Vayner. It was spoofed by actor Michael Cera in a video called "Impossible is the Opposite of Possible."

Keyboard Cat – Footage of a cat playing an electric keyboard that is appended to the end of blooper or other video as if to play the participants off stage after a mistake or gaffe.

Kony 2012 – An online video created by Invisible Children, Inc. to highlight the criminal acts of Joseph Kony to an international spotlight as part of a campaign to seek his capture and arrest, quickly gained tens of millions of viewers within a week, becoming, according to CNN, "the most viral YouTube video of all time".

The Last Lecture – Carnegie Mellon University professor Randy Pausch, dying of pancreatic cancer, delivers an upbeat lecture on Really Achieving Your Childhood Dreams.

Leave Britney Alone! – A viral video of Chris Crocker lashing out against critics of celebrity Britney Spears.

Lonelygirl15 – A popular viral video spread via YouTube featuring a teenage girl named, "Bree", who would post video updates about a variety of issues dealing with the life of a typical teenager. It was later found to be a professionally made, fictional work, produced by Mesh Flinders in Beverly Hills and starring Jessica Lee Rose.

MacGyver the Lizard – Videos of a large, dog-like lizard, who comes when his name is called.

Michelle Jenneke – "Michelle Jenneke dancing sexy as hell at junior world championships in Barcelona 2012" is a video of a 19-year-old hurdler Michelle Jenneke during her pre-race warm-up at the IAAF World Junior Championships in Barcelona. The video of Jenneke dancing pre-race was uploaded on 25 July on YouTube and had more than 13 million views in less than a week. The video made Jenneke an instant online celebrity.

Nek Minnit – A 10-second YouTube video from New Zealand featuring skater Levi Hawkin. This video inspired the term Nek Minnit, which is used at the end of a sentence in place of the words Next Minute. The video has received over two million views and has been parodied several times on YouTube; the TV3 show The Jono Project ran a series of clips titled Food in a Nek Minnit which parodied a nightly advertisement called Food in a Minute. As a result of the video, the term Nek Minnit was the most searched for word on Google in New Zealand for 2011.

My Story: Struggling, bullying, suicide and self-harm – On 7 September 2012, Amanda Todd posted a 9-minute YouTube video entitled My Story: Struggling, bullying, suicide and self-harm, which showed her using a series of flashcards to tell of her experiences being bullied. The video post went viral after her death on 10 October 2012, receiving over 1,600,000 views by 13 October 2012.

Potter Puppet Pals – a live action puppet show web series created by Neil Cicierega parodying the Harry Potter novel/film series by J. K. Rowling. Its video titled "The Mysterious Ticking Noise" has received more than 184 million views , making it the most famous video of the series.

Shia LaBeouf's Motivational Speech – A video of actor Shia LaBeouf giving a motivational speech. The video, a sequence from LaBeouf, Rönkkö & Turner's #INTRODUCTIONS project, was filmed against a green background and could be easily chroma keyed. Due to this, the video was used in various memes and the phrase "Just Do It" became associated with the video.

Ricardo Milos – A 2011 short video of the then-model Milos surfaced on Nico Nico Douga in 2010. The video contains Milos dancing in nothing but a jock strap and a red bandana.

The Spirit of Christmas –  Consists of two different animated short films made by Trey Parker and Matt Stone. To differentiate the two, they are often referred to as Jesus vs. Frosty (1992) and Jesus vs. Santa (1995). Brian Graden sent copies of Jesus vs. Santa to several of his friends, and from there it was copied and distributed, including on the internet, where it became one of the first viral videos.  They were created by animating construction paper cutouts with stop motion, and features prototypes of the main characters of South Park.

Star Wars Kid – A Québécois teenager became known as the "Star Wars Kid" after a video appeared on the Internet showing him swinging a golf ball retriever as if it were a lightsaber. Many parodies of the video were also made and circulated.

This is my story – A two-part video of 18-year-old American Internet personality Ben Breedlove explaining about his heart condition using note cards as a visual aid. The YouTube video was released on 18 December 2011, a week prior to Breedlove's death, and received world-wide attention.

Too Many Cooks – A 2014 short produced by Adult Swim that parodies the openings of many 1980s and 1990s American television shows with both meta and dark humor. Originally only played on Cartoon Network in place of early morning infomercials, the short soon gained attraction via social media.

Ty kto takoy? Davay, do svidaniya! ("Who are you? Come on, goodbye!" in Russian) – A video of Azerbaijani meykhana performers, that gained over 2 million views on YouTube. The jingle "Ty kto takoy? Davay, do svidaniya!" started trending on Twitter with the Russian hashtag #путинтыктотакойдавайдосвидания and a number of songs sampled the jingle since then.

Unexpected John Cena – Similar to Rickrolling, videos which seem to progress normally but then are interrupted using the video of wrestler John Cena's entrance song "The Time is Now" and performance, as if Cena were a scene stealer.

Wealdstone Raider – A video of Wealdstone FC supporter Gordon Hill shouting at fans of opposing Whitehawk FC, including the phrases "You want some?", "I'll give it ya [sic]", and "You've got no fans". Uploaded to YouTube in March 2013, the video went viral towards the end of 2014, culminating in a campaign by the Daily Mirror newspaper to get Hill to Christmas number one; his resultant charity single, "Got No Fans", reached number 5 in the UK Singles Charts.

Wombo combo – footage from a Super Smash Bros. Melee tournament known for its exceptionally loud commentary. The most famous line, "wombo combo", is spoken by Brandon "HomeMadeWaffles" Collier. Wombo Combo has been used in many MLG parodies and is one of the memes seen in the Wii U eShop game Meme Run.
Will Smith Slap – A clip from the 94th Academy Awards where the actor Will Smith slaps comedian Chris Rock in the face after he told a joke about Will's wife shaved hair. It has been shared a lot of times by users.

Music videos

Public service announcements
 Cow (2009) – A public service announcement graphically depicting the dangers of joy-riding. A clip from the video received over one million views on YouTube by 25 August 2009.

 Dumb Ways to Die (2012) – A music video featuring "a variety of cute characters killing themselves in increasingly idiotic ways" that went viral through sharing and social media. It was part of a public service announcement advertisement campaign by Metro Trains in Melbourne, Australia to promote rail safety.

 Embrace Life (2010) – A public service announcement for seatbelt advocacy made for a local area of the United Kingdom that achieved a million hits on its first two weeks on YouTube in 2010.

 Set Yourself Free (2014) – A fictitious public service announcement that discouraged truancy in schools. As of 2017, the video has over 20 million views on YouTube.

See also

 Internet meme
 Index of Internet-related articles
 List of Internet phenomena
 List of YouTubers
 List of most-viewed YouTube videos
 List of most viewed online videos in the first 24 hours
 Outline of the Internet

References

External links

 YouTube 'Rewind' – YouTube's page covering their top-viewed videos by year and brief information on their spread

History of the Internet
Internet-related lists

1
viral